Dušan Petković (born 27 January 1992) is a Serbian professional volleyball player, a member of the Serbia national team. He competed at the 2015 European Games held in Baku. At the professional club level, he plays for Kioene Padova.

Honours

Clubs
 National championships
 2010/2011  Serbian Cup, with Crvena Zvezda
 2011/2012  Serbian SuperCup, with Crvena Zvezda
 2011/2012  Serbian Championship, with Crvena Zvezda
 2012/2013  Serbian SuperCup, with Crvena Zvezda
 2012/2013  Serbian Cup, with Crvena Zvezda
 2012/2013  Serbian Championship, with Crvena Zvezda
 2013/2014  Serbian SuperCup, with Crvena Zvezda
 2013/2014  Serbian Cup, with Crvena Zvezda
 2013/2014  Serbian Championship, with Crvena Zvezda
 2016/2017  Emir Cup, with Al Rayyan

Youth national team
 2009  CEV U19 European Championship
 2009  FIVB U19 World Championship
 2013  FIVB U23 World Championship

Individual awards
 2018: Italian Championship – Best Scorer  (508)
 2018: Italian Championship – Best Spiker 
 2019: Italian Championship – Best Scorer  (590)
 2019: Italian Championship – Best Spiker

References

External links
 
 Player profile at LegaVolley.it 
 Player profile at PlusLiga.pl 
 Player profile at Volleybox.net
 

1992 births
Living people
Sportspeople from Niš
Serbian men's volleyball players
European Games competitors for Serbia
Volleyball players at the 2015 European Games
Serbian expatriate sportspeople in France
Expatriate volleyball players in France
Serbian expatriate sportspeople in Qatar
Expatriate volleyball players in Qatar
Serbian expatriate sportspeople in Italy
Expatriate volleyball players in Italy
Serbian expatriate sportspeople in Poland
Expatriate volleyball players in Poland
AS Cannes Volley-Ball players
Skra Bełchatów players
Projekt Warsaw players
Opposite hitters